Future Pop is the sixth studio album by Japanese girl group Perfume, released on August 15, 2018 by Universal Music Japan sublabels Universal J and Perfume Records. The album debuted at the top spot of the Oricon Weekly Albums Chart with 79,282 copies on its first week of release, making it their seventh number-one album in Japan. The album also yielded its first number-one release on the Oricon Weekly Digital Albums chart with 7,396 downloads. The album comprises a total of twelve tracks, with three of them being released as maxi singles: "Tokyo Girl", "If You Wanna", and "Mugen Mirai", plus their respective B-sides "Houseki no Ame", "Everyday", and "Fusion", and six previously-unreleased tracks, with one of them being the album's promotional single, "Let Me Know".

Track listing
All songs written, arranged, and produced by Yasutaka Nakata.

Blu-ray/DVD bonus track list

Limited Edition Blu-ray/DVD bonus track list

Charts

Certifications

References

Perfume (Japanese band) albums
2018 albums
Japanese-language albums
Albums produced by Yasutaka Nakata
Future bass albums
Universal J albums